Percy Marmont (25 November 1883 – 3 March 1977) was an English film actor.

Biography
 
Marmont appeared in more than 80 films between 1916 and 1968. A veteran film actor by 1923, he scored a big hit that year in If Winter Comes, later remade by MGM in 1947.  He is best remembered today for playing the title character in Lord Jim (1925), the first film version of Joseph Conrad's novel, and for playing one of Clara Bow's love interests in the Paramount Pictures film Mantrap (1926).

He was born and died in London, England. Marmont had two daughters with his wife Dorothy, Patricia Marmont, an actress then theatrical agent at one time married to actor Nigel Green, and Pamela, a stage actress married to actor Moray Watson.

Filmography 

 De Voortrekkers (1916) as Horseman (uncredited)
 The Monk and the Woman (1917) as Brother Paul
 Rose of the World (1918) as Lieutenant Belhune
 The Lie (1918) as Nol Dibdin
 The Turn of the Wheel (1918) as Frank Grey
 In the Hollow of Her Hand (1918) as Brandon Booth
 The Indestructible Wife (1919) as Schuyler Horne
 Three Men and a Girl (1919) as Dr. Henry Forsyth
 The Winchester Woman (1919) as David Brinton
 The Climbers (1919) as Ned Warden
 The Vengeance of Durand (1919) as Tom Franklin
 Slaves of Pride (1920) as Brewster Howard
 The Sporting Duchess (1920) as Douglas, Duke of Desborough
 Away Goes Prudence (1920) as Hewitt Harland
 The Branded Woman (1920) as Douglas Courtenay
 Dead Men Tell No Tales (1920) as George Stevenson Cole
 What's Your Reputation Worth? (1921) as Anthony Blake
 Love's Penalty (1921) as Steven Saunders
 Without Benefit of Clergy (1921)
 Wife Against Wife (1921) as Stannard Dole
 The First Woman (1922) as Paul Marsh
 Married People (1922) as Robert Cluer
 If Winter Comes (1923) as Mark Sabre
 The Midnight Alarm (1923) as Captain Harry Westmore
 The Light That Failed (1923) as Dick Heldar
 Broadway Broke (1923) as Tom Kerrigan
 You Can't Get Away with It (1923) as Charles Hemingway
 The Man Life Passed By (1923) as John Turbin
 The Shooting of Dan McGrew (1924) as Jim, Lou's Husband
 The Marriage Cheat (1924) as Paul Mayne
 When a Girl Loves (1924) as Count Michael
 The Enemy Sex (1924) as Garry Lindaberry
 The Legend of Hollywood (1924) as John Smith
 The Clean Heart (1924) as Philip Wriford
 Broken Laws (1924) as Richard Heath
 K – The Unknown (1924)) as 'K' Le Moyne
 Idle Tongues (1924) as Dr. Ephraim Nye
 Daddy's Gone A-Hunting (1925) as Julian
 Just a Woman (1925) as George Rand
 The Street of Forgotten Men (1925) as Easy Money Charley
 A Woman's Faith (1925) as Donovan Steele
 The Shining Adventure (1925) as Dr. Hugo McLean
 Fine Clothes (1925) as Peter Hungerford
 Lord Jim (1925) as Lord Jim
 Infatuation (1925) as Sir Arthur Little
 The Miracle of Life (1926) as Blair Howell
 Fascinating Youth (1926) as Percy Marmont
 Aloma of the South Seas (1926) as Bob Holden
 Mantrap (1926) as Ralph Prescott
 San Francisco Nights (1928) as John Vickery
 The Stronger Will (1928) as Clive Morton
 Yellow Stockings (1928) as Gavin Sinclair
 Sir or Madam (1928) as Sir Ralph Wellalone
 The Warning (1928) as Jim
 The Lady of the Lake (1928) as James FitzJames
 The Silver King (1929) as Wilfred Denver
 The Squeaker (1930) as Captain Leslie
 Cross Roads (1930) as Jim Wyndham
 The Loves of Ariane (1931) as Anthony Fraser
 The Written Law (1931) as Sir John Rochester
 Rich and Strange (1931) as Commander Gordon
 The Silver Greyhound (1932) as Norton Fitzwarren
 Blind Spot (1932) as Holland Janney
 Say It with Music (1932) as Philip Weston
 Her Imaginary Lover (1933) as Lord Michael Ware
 The White Lilac (1935) as Tollitt
 Vanity (1935) as Jefferson Brown
 Secret Agent (1936) as Caypor
 The Captain's Table (1936) as John Brooke
 David Livingstone (1936) as David Livingstone
 Conquest of the Air (1936) as Wilbur Wright (uncredited)
 Action for Slander (1937) as William Cowbit
 The Pearls of the Crown (1937) as Le cardinal Wolsey (uncredited)
 Young and Innocent (1937) as Col. Burgoyne
 Those Kids from Town (1942) as Earl
 Penn of Pennsylvania (1942) as Holme
 I'll Walk Beside You (1943) as Vicar
 Loyal Heart (1946) as John Armstrong
 No Orchids for Miss Blandish (1948) as John Blandish
 Dark Secret (1949) as Vicar
 The Gambler and the Lady (1952) as Lord Willens-Hortland
 Four Sided Triangle (1953) as Sir Walter
 The Million Pound Note (1954) as Lord Hurlingham (uncredited)
 Knave of Hearts (1954) as Catherine's Father (uncredited)
 Footsteps in the Fog (1955) as Magistrate
 Lisbon (1956) as Lloyd Merrill
 The Trials of Oscar Wilde (1960) as Guest at Theatre (uncredited)
 Hostile Witness (1968) as Justice Matthew Gregory

References

External links 

 

1883 births
1977 deaths
20th-century English male actors
English male film actors
English male silent film actors
Male actors from London